Pike Township is one of the seventeen townships of Stark County, Ohio, United States.  The 2020 census found 3,818 people in the township, 3,069 of whom lived in the unincorporated portions of the township.

Geography
Located in the southern part of the county, it borders the following townships:
Canton Township - north
Osnaburg Township - northeast corner
Sandy Township - east
Rose Township, Carroll County - southeast corner
Sandy Township, Tuscarawas County - south
Lawrence Township, Tuscarawas County - southwest
Bethlehem Township - west
Perry Township - northwest corner

The village of East Sparta is located in southeastern Pike Township.

Name and history
In 1806, George Young and his wife Catherine moved to what is now known as East Sparta, becoming the first permanent settlers of Pike Township. However, there are inconstancies in government and family records that instead put him in Pike in 1800, which would make him the first settler of Stark County.

In 1815, the township was named after Zebulon Pike.  It is one of eight Pike Townships statewide.

Government

The township is governed by a three-member board of trustees, who are elected in November of odd-numbered years to a four-year term beginning on the following January 1. Two are elected in the year after the presidential election and one is elected in the year before it. There is also an elected township fiscal officer, who serves a four-year term beginning on April 1 of the year after the election, which is held in November of the year before the presidential election. Vacancies in the fiscal officership or on the board of trustees are filled by the remaining trustees.

References

External links
Township website
County website

Townships in Stark County, Ohio
Townships in Ohio
1815 establishments in Ohio
Populated places established in 1815